Andy Dow (born 7 February 1973) is a Scottish former footballer who played for numerous clubs in a defensive role.

Dow started out with Scottish junior side Sporting Club 85, before signing for Dundee in 1990. He moved south to sign for Chelsea for £250,000 in 1993, staying for three years. He had a spell with Bradford City on loan, and then played for a succession of Scottish clubs, including Hibernian, Aberdeen, Motherwell (scoring once against Kilmarnock), St Mirren, Arbroath and Raith Rovers

Honours

Aberdeen
 Scottish League Cup
 Runner-up: 1999–2000
 Scottish Cup
 Runner-up: 1999–2000

References 

Sources

External links 

Sporting-heroes.net

1973 births
Living people
Footballers from Dundee
Scottish footballers
Scotland under-21 international footballers
Scottish Premier League players
Scottish Football League players
Premier League players
English Football League players
Aberdeen F.C. players
Arbroath F.C. players
Bradford City A.F.C. players
Chelsea F.C. players
Dundee F.C. players
Hibernian F.C. players
Motherwell F.C. players
Raith Rovers F.C. players
St Mirren F.C. players
Association football fullbacks